The Aditya-class auxiliary ship is a class of replenishment and repair ships currently in service with the Indian Navy. The class is a modified and lengthened version of the original Deepak class.  is the only ship in this class.

Gallery

See also
Komandarm Fedko-class oiler

References

Notes

Sources 
Bharat Rakshak

Naval ships of India
Auxiliary replenishment ship classes
Aditya-class replenishment and repair ships
Ships built in India

ja:アディティア (補給艦)